SEC24 family, member A (S. cerevisiae) is a protein that in humans is encoded by the SEC24A gene. The protein belongs to a protein family that are homologous to yeast Sec24. It is a component of coat protein II (COPII)-coated vesicles that mediate protein transport from the endoplasmic reticulum.

Model organisms 

Model organisms have been used in the study of SEC24A function. A conditional knockout mouse line, called Sec24atm1a(KOMP)Wtsi was generated as part of the International Knockout Mouse Consortium program — a high-throughput mutagenesis project to generate and distribute animal models of disease to interested scientists.

Male and female animals underwent a standardized phenotypic screen to determine the effects of deletion. Twenty five tests were carried out on mutant mice and one significant abnormality was observed. Male homozygotes had decreased circulating cholesterol and LDL cholesterol levels.

References

Further reading

External links 
 PDBe-KB provides an overview of all the structure information available in the PDB for Human Protein transport protein Sec24A 

Genes mutated in mice
Human proteins